Sona Vəlixan (1883-1982), was an Azerbaijani physician. 

She became the first female physician in Azerbaijan in 1908.

References

1883 births
1982 deaths
Azerbaijani physicians
Date of birth missing
Date of death missing
Physicians from the Russian Empire